Shahdol Lok Sabha constituency is one of the 29 Lok Sabha constituencies in Madhya Pradesh state in central India. This constituency is reserved for the candidates belonging to the Scheduled tribes. It covers the entire Anuppur and Umaria districts and parts of Shahdol and Katni districts.

Assembly segments
Presently, since the delimitation of parliamentary and legislative assembly constituencies in 2008, Shahdol Lok Sabha constituency comprises the following eight Vidhan Sabha (Legislative Assembly) segments:

Members of Parliament

^ by poll

Election results

See also
 Anuppur district
 Shahdol district
 Umaria district
 List of Constituencies of the Lok Sabha

References

Lok Sabha constituencies in Madhya Pradesh
Shahdol district
Anuppur district
Umaria district
Katni district